

1970

1971

1972

1973

1974

1975

1976

1977

1978

1979

1970–1979 statistical leaders

See also
 University of Arkansas
 Arkansas Razorbacks
 Arkansas Razorbacks football, 1960–1969
 Arkansas Razorbacks football, 1980–89
 Southwest Conference
 Liberty Bowl
 Cotton Bowl Classic
 Orange Bowl
 Fiesta Bowl
 Sugar Bowl

Notes
Arkansas Razorbacks Sports Network Online 1970–1979 Football Schedule/Results

1970-1979